Christina Oskarsson (previously Christina Nenes), born 1951, is a Swedish social democratic politician. She has been a member of the Riksdag since 1998.

External links
Christina Oskarsson at the Riksdag website

Members of the Riksdag from the Social Democrats
Living people
1951 births
Women members of the Riksdag
20th-century Swedish women politicians
20th-century Swedish politicians
21st-century Swedish women politicians